Yuan Yufang (born 1 February 1976 in Beijing, PR China) is a Malaysian race walker.

She competed at the 2000 Summer Olympics, 2004 Summer Olympics, and 2008 Summer Olympics.

Achievements

References

External links
 

Living people
1976 births
Athletes from Beijing
Naturalised citizens of Malaysia
Malaysian female racewalkers
Chinese female racewalkers
Olympic athletes of Malaysia
Athletes (track and field) at the 2000 Summer Olympics
Athletes (track and field) at the 2004 Summer Olympics
Athletes (track and field) at the 2008 Summer Olympics
Athletes (track and field) at the 1998 Asian Games
Athletes (track and field) at the 2002 Asian Games
Commonwealth Games bronze medallists for Malaysia
Commonwealth Games medallists in athletics
Athletes (track and field) at the 1998 Commonwealth Games
Athletes (track and field) at the 2002 Commonwealth Games
World Athletics Championships athletes for Malaysia
Southeast Asian Games medalists in athletics
Southeast Asian Games gold medalists for Malaysia
Competitors at the 2017 Southeast Asian Games
Asian Games competitors for China
Medallists at the 2002 Commonwealth Games